Devdas  is a 2002 Bengali film based on the Sharat Chandra Chattopadhyay novell, Devdas.

Cast
 Prasenjit Chatterjee as Devdas
 Tapas Paul as Chunilal
 Arpita Pal as Parbati
 Indrani Haldar as Chandramukhi
 Chetana Das

References

External links
 Official website
 

2002 films
2000s Bengali-language films
Bengali-language Indian films
Devdas films
Films set in Kolkata
Films directed by Shakti Samanta
Films about courtesans in India
Films based on Indian novels
Films scored by Babul Bose